The Royal Photographic Society of Great Britain, commonly known as the Royal Photographic Society (RPS), is one of the world's oldest photographic societies. It was founded in London, England, in 1853 as the Photographic Society of London with the objective of promoting the art and science of photography, and in 1853 received royal patronage from Queen Victoria and Prince Albert.

A change to the society's name to reflect the patronage was, however, not considered expedient at the time. In 1874, it was renamed the Photographic Society of Great Britain, and only from 1894 did it become known as the Royal Photographic Society of Great Britain, a title which it continues to use today. On 25 June 2019, the Duchess of Cambridge, now Catherine, Princess of Wales, became the Society's Patron, taking over from Queen Elizabeth II who had been patron since 1952.

A registered charity since 1962, in July 2004, the society was granted a royal charter recognising its eminence in the field of photography as a learned society. For most of its history the Society was based at various premises in London; since 2019 its headquarters and gallery are in Bristol, England. Membership remains international and open to anyone with an interest in photography.

In addition to ordinary membership, the Society offers three levels of distinction – Licentiate, Associate and Fellow – which set recognised standards of achievement throughout the world, and can be applied for by both members and non-members, in all aspects of photography and vocational qualifications in the areas of creative industries and imaging science. The Society runs a programme of events throughout the United Kingdom and abroad, through local groups and special interest groups. The Society acts as a national voice for photographers and for photography more generally, and it represents these interests on a range of governmental and national bodies dealing with matters such as copyright and photographers' rights.

History 

Photographers were slow in coming together and forming clubs and societies. The first was an informal grouping the Edinburgh Calotype Club around 1843. The first British photographic society, the Leeds Photographic Society was formed in 1852 but between 1878 and 1881 it ceased to exist independently. The RPS has existed continuously since January 1853. In other countries the Société héliographique was established in Paris in 1851 and the Société française de photographie was founded in Paris in 1854.

Founding and early history 
The catalyst behind the formation of The Photographic Society was Roger Fenton. The Great Exhibition of 1851 had raised public awareness of photography and in December 1852 an exhibition of nearly 800 photographs at The Society of Arts had brought together amateur and professional photographers. The inaugural meeting of The Photographic Society was held on 20 January 1853. Fenton became the Society's first secretary, a position he held for three years and Henry White was an early treasurer between 1866 and 1872.

Modernisation and the 1970s 
As Jane Fletcher has argued the changing nature of photography and photographic education in the early 1970s forced The Society to modernise and to become more relevant to British photography. An internal review led to constitutional changes, the introduction of a new distinction called the Licentiate in 1972 and six new specialist groups were established.

Bath project 
The rising cost of maintaining The Society's premises in South Audley Street, London, eventually led the society's executive committee to look for alternative premises. The Council approved at a meeting on 1 April 1977 a move to Bath and the establishment of a National Centre of Photography to house the Society's headquarters and collection. An appeal for £300,000 was launched in the summer of 1978 for the funds needed to convert The Octagon and adjacent buildings in Milsom Street, Bath. The inaugural exhibition opened in May 1980 with the building officially opened by Princess Margaret in April 1981.

Premises 

Although the Society's inaugural meeting took places at the Society of Arts in London, it was some time before the Society had its own permanent home. It held functions as a number of London addresses, some concurrently for different types of meetings.

Premises used were: Royal Society of Arts, John Adam Street; 20 Bedford Street, 4 Trafalgar Square, 21 Regent Street, 28 George Street (Hanover Square), 1 Coventry Street; Kings College, Strand; 9 Conduit Street, 5A Pall Mall East – used for certain meetings until 1899; 50 Great Russell Street; and 12 Hanover Square.

The Society's premises were:
 1899–1909 – 66 Russell Square, London.
 1909–1940 – 35 Russell Square, London.
 1940–1968 – Princes Gate, South Kensington, London.
 1968–1970 – 1 Maddox Street, Mayfair, London (temporary premises).
 1970–1979 – 14 South Audley Street, Mayfair, London
 1980–2003 – The Octagon, Milsom Street, Bath.
 2004 – January 2019 – Fenton House, 122 Wells Road, Bath; officially opened 16 February 2005.
 7 February 2019 – Paintworks, Bath Road, Bristol.

Collection and archive

Collection 
The Society had collected photographs and items of historical importance on an ad hoc basis, particularly from the 1890s. With the appointment of John Dudley Johnston as Honorary Curator, a post he held from 1924 to 1955, a more proactive approach was taken to collecting. Before Johnston's appointment the collection had concentrated on technical advances of photography, and he began add pictorial photography to the holdings. On Johnston's death in 1955 the role of Honorary Curator was taken over by his wife Florence and a succession of paid and unpaid staff, with Professor Margaret Harker as Honorary Curator over a long period. The collection was moved to the National Museum of Photography, Film, and Television at Bradford (later the National Media Museum) in 2002; the move was supported by the Head of the museum, Amanda Nevill, who had been the society's secretary in the 1990s.

By 1953 the number of items in the society's collection had reached 'upwards' of 3000 items. At the time of the collection's transfer to Bradford it consisted of some 270,000 photographic objects, over 6000 items of photographic equipment, 13,000 books, 13,000 bound periodicals, and 5000 other photography-related documents.

The collection was transferred from the National Media Museum to the Victoria and Albert Museum in 2017, where it forms a central part of the museum's Photography Centre.

The RPS is forming a new RPS Collection of photographs and material relevant to its own history, that of its former members and which will support its educational activities.

The Tyng Collection, part of the RPS Collection and now at the V&A Museum, is a collection of outstanding pictorial photography started in 1927 by an American philanthropist and society member, Stephen H. Tyng. He established a foundation to promote and recognise photographic work of outstanding pictorial merit. The first colour print to be accepted into the Tyng Collection, in 1960, was "Madrasi Fishermen" taken by Dr S. D. Jouhar during his six-month trip to India in 1959.

Archives 
The society's early records, Council, Committee and Meeting Minute books, are held with the society's collection at the V&A. There is no published or online record of former or current members of the society. Occasional lists of members were published by the society up the 1890s when lists were issued more regularly; from the 1930s membership lists were issued periodically and are now not issued. New members have usually been recorded in the Photographic Journal. Dr Michael Pritchard undertook a project to make an online searchable database of members from 1853 to 1901, published by De Montfort University's photographic history research centre. The Society has a card index of members from the late 1920s to 1980s, which it will search on request, and may also be able to assist with membership enquiries between 1900 and the 1930s.

Publications 
From the Society's formation it has published a journal and other publications have been issued over the years.

The Photographic Journal 
The Society's journal was originally called The Journal of the Photographic Society of London and for most of its existence has simply been called The Photographic Journal, it is now called RPS Journal. It has been published continuously since 1853 making it the UK's oldest photographic periodical. The journal, particularly in its early years was read and distributed beyond the Society's membership.  Past editors have included Arthur Henfrey, Hugh Welch Diamond, William de Wiveleslie Abney, H. H. Blacklock, and more recently Jack Schofield and David Land. The current editor is Kathleen Morgan.

The Imaging Science Journal 
The Society publishes a peer-reviewed journal devoted to imaging science and technology, The Imaging Science Journal (ISG), previously known as the Journal of Photographic Science. The ISJ is now published on behalf of The Society by Maney Publishing in print and digital versions.

The Year's Photography 

The Year's Photography was published annually by the Society from 1922 until at least 1961. The flyleaf of the 1957 edition states: "This edition contains a selection from all the exhibitions held in 1956 under the Society's auspices which contained pictures suitable for reproduction There are also review of artistic photography and of the nature exhibition." The publication gives a broad overview of the state of British amateur and professional photography during the year.

Other publications 
Over the years the Society has published a number of one-off publications often in partnership with commercial publishers. These include John Wall's Directory of British Photographic Collections in conjunction with Heinemann (1977), Roger Reynolds (ed.), Portfolio One (2007) and Roger Reynolds (ed.), Portfolio Two (2010). The Society publishes an annual International Print Exhibition catalogue and increasingly publishes digital catalogues of its exhibitions.

Membership
There are no restrictions on membership, which is international and includes amateur and professional photographers, photographic scientists and those involved in exhibiting, curating and writing about photography, as well as those with a general interest in the medium. Many of the great names in photographic history as well as many well-known photographers today have been members.

Special interest groups
The Society established special interest groups to cater for specific interests within the membership. These have included:
 Pictorial Group (now renamed Visual Art Group) (1919)
 Science and Technical Group (now renamed Imaging Science Group) (1920)
 Kinematograph Group (1923)
 Colour Group (1927)
 Historical Group (1972)
 Digital Imaging Group (1996)
 Documentary Group (date)
 Contemporary Group (date)
 Landscape Group (date)
 Analogue Group (date)
 Women in Photography Group (date)
As of 2016 there are fourteen groups

Distinctions and qualifications 
Until 1895 membership was limited simply to 'members' with some minor variations for those living overseas, In that year the Society introduced a new membership category of Fellow and it now offers (from lowest to highest distinction):
LRPS: Licentiateship of the Royal Photographic Society introduced in 1972
ARPS: Associateship of the Royal Photographic Society introduced in 1924
FRPS: Fellowship of the Royal Photographic Society introduced in 1895

These require the submission of evidence – photographs or written – which is assessed by competent panels before they are awarded by the Society's Council. The society also awards honorary fellowship, HonFRPS, to the persons who distinguished themselves in the field of photography. Usually, those awarded are famous and extremely known photographers in the field of art photography. Every year, no more than eight persons are awarded HonFRPS, including society incoming president and recipients of society's Progress and Centenary Medals.

In addition, the Society's Imaging Scientist Qualifications provide a structure leading to professional qualifications for engineers, scientists, and technologists whose professional activities are concerned with quantitative or mechanic aspects of imaging systems or their applications. These are broken down into four levels;
QIS; Qualified Imaging Scientist and Licentiate (QIS LRPS) of the Royal Photographic Society (Level 1)
GIS; Graduate Imaging Scientist and Associate (GIS ARPS) of the Royal Photographic Society (Level 2)
AIS; Accredited Imaging Scientist and Associate (AIS ARPS) of the Royal Photographic Society (Level 3)
ASIS; Accredited Senior Imaging Scientist and Fellow (ASIS FRPS) of the Royal Photographic Society (Level 4)

The RPS introduced in 2013 a qualification for those working in the Creative Industries and using photography. These also carry the Society's Distinction and, like the Imaging Science Qualification, the two are used together. 
QCIQ; Qualified in Creative Industries and Licentiate (QCIQ LRPS) of the Royal Photographic Society
GCIQ; Graduate in Creative Industries and Associate (GCIQ ARPS) of the Royal Photographic Society
ACIQ; Accredited in Creative Industries and Associate (ACIQ ARPS) of the Royal Photographic Society
ASCIQ; Accredited Senior in Creative Industries and Fellowship (ASCIQ FRPS) of the Royal Photographic Society

Exhibitions 
The Society has held an annual exhibition since 1854 and in 2021 it will be in its 163rd edition.  The Society now holds an annual International Photography Exhibition, which tours the United Kingdom, and other exhibitions. At its new headquarters it shows four major photography exhibitions annually.

Workshops
The Society runs more than 300 workshops and lectures throughout the UK that are open to members and non-members.  Many are held at the RPS headquarters in Bath and range from an Introduction to Digital Photography to Plant and Garden Photography.

Awards and medals 
Each year the Society presents a series of awards to photographers and other individuals in photography. The recipient receives a medal.

The highest award of the RPS is the Progress Medal, which was instituted in 1878.

The Society's other annual awards are the: Centenary Medal, Award for Cinematic Production, Award for Outstanding Service to Photography,  the Combined Royal Colleges Medal,  the Education Award, the Fenton Award (and Honorary Life Membership), the Hood Medal, the J Dudley Johnston Medal, the Lumière Award, RPS Member's Award (and Honorary Life Membership),  the Selwyn Award, the Vic Odden Award, and The Bill Wisden Fellowship of the Year.

Progress Medal
The Progress Medal is awarded in recognition of any invention, research, publication or other contribution which has resulted in an important advance in the scientific or technological development of photography or imaging in the widest sense. It also carries with it an Honorary Fellowship of The Society. Recipients have been:

1878 –  Captain William de Wiveleslie Abney
1881 –  W. Willis
1882 –  Leon Warnerke
1883 –  Walter B. Woodbury
1884 –  Josef Maria Eder
1885 –  Josef Maria Eder
1890 –  Captain William de Wiveleslie Abney
1891 –  Colonel James Waterhouse
1895 –  Peter Henry Emerson
1896 –  Thomas Rudolphus Dallmeyer
1897 –  Gabriel Lippmann
1898 –  Ferdinand Hurter and Vero Charles Driffield
1899 –  No award
1900 –  Louis Ducos du Hauron
1901 –  Richard Leach Maddox
1902 –  Joseph Wilson Swan
1903 –  Frederic Eugene Ives
1904 – Not awarded
1905 –  Dr. Paul Rudolph
1906 –  Pierre Jules César Janssen
1907 –  E Sanger Shepherd
1908 –  John Sterry
1909 –  A Lumiere and sons
1910 –  Alfred Watkins
1911 –  Not awarded
1912 –  Henry Chapman Jones
1913 –  Charles Edward Kenneth Mees
1914 –  William Bates Ferguson
1915 –  André Callier
1916–1920 – Not awarded
1921 –  Frank Forster Renwick
1922 –  Not awarded
1923 –  Nahum Ellan Luboshez
1924 –  Alfred Stieglitz
1925–26 – Not awarded
1927 –  George Eastman
1928 –  Samuel E Sheppard
1929 –  Olaf F Bloch
1932 –  Hinricus Lüppo-Cramer
1935 –  Harold Dennis Taylor
1936 –  Arthur Samuel Newman
1944 –  Francis James Mortimer CBE
1946 –  John G Capstaff
1947 –  Not awarded
1948 –  Loyd Ancile Jones
1949 –  John Eggert
1950 –  Louis Phillippe Clerc
1951 –  J Dudley Johnston
1952 –  Charles Edward Kenneth Mees
1953 –  Marcel Abribat
1954 –  Julian Webb
1955 –  J. D. Kendall
1956 –  Not awarded
1957 –  Edwin H. Land
1959 –  Cecil Waller
1960 –  Edward J. Steichen
1961 –  André Rott
1962 –  Frances M. Hamer
1963 –  Leopold Godowsky Jr. and Leopold Mannes
1964 –  Harold Eugene Edgerton
1965 –  Walter Clark
1966 –  L. Fritz Gruber
1967 –  E. R. Davies
1968 –  Konstantine Vladimirovich Chibosov
1969 –  Laurence E. Hallett
1970 –  W. F. Berg
1971 –  Edward William Herbert Selwyn
1972 –  Hellmut Frieser
1973 –  T. Howard James
1974 –  Man Ray
1975 –  Beaumont Newhall
1976 –  W. T. Hanson Jr
1977 –  Stephen Dalton
1978 –  Photographic Technology Division, NASA
1979 –  Bill Brandt
1980 –  Oxford Scientific Films
1981 –  Norman Parkinson
1982 –  Sue Davies
1983 –  R. W. G. Hunt
1984 –  Tom Hopkinson
1985 –  Lord Snowdon
1986 –  Yuri Denisyuk
1987 –  Roy Jeffreys
1988 –  David Hockney
1989 –  Eric Hosking
1990 –  Tadaaki Tani
1991 –  John Szarkowski
1992 –  G Farnell
1993 –  Lennart Nilsson
1994 –  John Wesley Mitchell
1995 –  Thomas Knoll and John Knoll
1996 –  Paul B Gilman
1998 –  Emmett N. Leith
1999 –  Leo J Thomas
2000 –  A Zaleski
2001 –  C T Elliott
2002 –  Brad B. Amos and John G. White
2003 –  Tim Berners-Lee
2004 –  Eric R. Fossum
2005 –  Carver Mead, Richard F. Lyon, Richard B. Merrill
2006 –  Ferenc Krausz
2007 –  Larry J. Hornbeck PhD
2008 –  David Attenborough
2009 –  Bryce E. Bayer
2010 –  Nobukazu Teranishi
2011 –  Rodney Shaw
2012 –  Steven J. Sasson
2013 –  Paul B. Corkum
2014 –  Tim Webber
2015 –  George E. Smith
2016 –  Palmer Luckey
2017 –  Michael Francis Tompsett
2018 –  Jacques Dubochet, Joachim Frank, Richard Henderson
2019 –  Alan Bovik
2020 –  Chuck Hull
2021 –  Katie Bouman
2022 –  Leonardo Chiariglione and Graham Hudson

Centenary Medal
According to the Society's website this award is "in recognition of a sustained, significant contribution to the art of photography". Recipients have been:

1993 – Sebastião Salgado
1994 – Cornell Capa
1995 – Robert Delpire
1996–1997 – Freddie Young
1998 – Josef Koudelka
1999 – William Klein
2000 – Ray Metzker
2001 – Paul Caponigro
2002 – Elliott Erwitt
2003 – Special anniversary medals awarded (150th anniversary)
2004 – Arnold Newman
2005 – David Bailey
2006 – Susan Meiselas
2007 – Don McCullin
2008 – Martin Parr
2009 – Annie Leibovitz
2010 – Albert Watson
2011 – Terry O'Neill
2012 – Joel Meyerowitz
2013 – Brian Griffin
2014 – Steve McCurry
2015 – Wolfgang Tillmans
2016 – Thomas Struth
2017 – Hiroshi Sugimoto
2018 – Nan Goldin
2019 – Sophie Calle
2020 – Sally Mann
2021 – Bruce Davidson
2022 – Destiny Deacon

Cinematic Production Award
This award is given to an individual for outstanding achievement or sustained contribution in the production, direction or development of film for the cinema, television, online or new media. Recipients have been:

Award for Outstanding Service to Photography
According to the Society's website this award "carries with it an Honorary Fellowship of The Society. It recognizes major sustained, outstanding and influential contributions to the advancement of Photography and/or Imaging in their widest meanings." The recipients are:

Combined Royal Colleges Medal
Established in 1958 by the RPS in collaboration with the Royal College of Physicians of London, the Royal College of Surgeons of England and the Royal College of Obstetricians and Gynaecologists, this medal is awarded for "an outstanding contribution to the advancement and/or application of medical photography or the wider field of medical imaging".

Education Award
According to the Society's website this award "is given for outstanding achievement or sustained contribution in photographic education". The recipients are:
2011 – Paul Delmar, who taught Press Photography and Photojournalism at Norton College, Sheffield, for 30 years

Fenton Medal / Fenton Award (and Honorary Life Membership)
This award, established in 1980 and named after Roger Fenton, one of the RPS's founders, is made for an outstanding contribution to the work of The Royal Photographic Society. Usually, up to four Fenton Medals are awarded each year and since 1998 this award carries Honorary Membership of the RPS.

Hood Medal
This medal is awarded "for a body of photographic work produced to promote or raise awareness of an aspect of public benefit or service". It was instituted in 1933 when Harold Hood offered to present an annual medal for photography with a particular emphasis on work for public service. The recipients have been:

1933   –    G. Aubourne Clarke
1935   –    Edwin H. Land
1936   –    J. Crowther Cos
1948   –    J. W. Cottingham
1939   –    J. A. Fairfax-Fozzard
1941   –    H. Bedford Lemere
1942   –    Basil Hill
1945   –    Margaret F. Harker
1946   –    J. Crowther Cos
1947   –    S. H. Thorpe
1948   –    Margaret F. Harker
1949   –    W. Mortensen
1950   –    L. M. Condax
1951   –    Institute of Ophthalmology (Department of Medical Illustration)
1956   –    A. Faulkner Taylor
1957   –    Clive Cadwallader
1958   –    Maurice Broomfield
1959   –    E. Victor Willmott
1960   –    Walter Nurnberg
1961   –    Alan S. Marshall
1962   –    Adolf Morath
1964   –    Gordon Clemetson
1966   –    T. C. Dodds
1968   –    W. H. Baddeley
1970   –    K. G. Moreman
1971   –    Stephen Dalton
1972   –    Pat Whitehouse
1973   –    John Chittock
1974   –    R. M. Callender
1975   –    Heather Angel
1976   –    Ronald Smith
1977   –    Jacques Cousteau
1978   –    Lord Snowdon
1979   –    Richard Attenborough
1980   –    Harold Evans
1981   –    Freddie Reed
1982   –    Brian Tremain
1983   –    John Webster
1984   –    Brian Coe
1985   –    Leslie Ryder
1986   –    Zoe Dominic
1987   –    Mark Haworth-Booth
1988   –    Clifford Bestall
1989   –    Colin Ford
1990   –    Mike Ware
1992   –    Llanfranco Colombo
1993   –    Karl Steinorth
2003   –    Joop Berendsen, Tom Gatsonides, Ted Janssen
2004   –    Mark Holborn
2005   –    Mike Birbeck
2006   –    Ron Smith
2007   –    Mark Sealy
2008   –    Gina Glover
2009   –    François Hébel
2010   –    Tiffany Fairey, Anna Blackman
2011   –    Edmund Clark
2012   –    Marcus Bleasdale
2013   –    Derek Kendall
2014   –    James Balog
2015   –    Jean-Jacques Naudet
2016   –    Nick Hedges
2017   –    Siân Davey
2019   –    Laia Abril
2020   –    Poulomi Basu
2021   –    Dexter McLean
2022   –    Hoda Afshar

J Dudley Johnston Award / Medal

According to the Society's website this is an "award for major achievement in the field of photographic criticism or the history of photography. To be awarded for sustained excellence over a period of time, or for a single outstanding publication". The recipients are:

Lumière Award
The Lumière Award is given for major achievement in British cinematography, video or animation.

RPS Member's Award (and Honorary Life Membership)
An award, established in 2005, given to an ordinary member who, in the opinion of Council, has shown extraordinary support for The Society over a sustained period.

Selwyn Award
This award is intended for those under-35 years who have conducted successful science-based research connected with imaging. Sponsored by the Imaging Science Group of the RSP, it was introduced in 1994 in memory of eminent photographic scientist E. W. H. Selwyn, who was the recipient of the Progress Medal in 1971 and the Williamson Research Award in 1936.

1994 – J. R. Palmer
1995 – A. Clarke
1996–1997 – Andrew Fitz
1998 – Adrian Ford
1999 – Juliet Rason
2000 – Sophie Triantaphillidou
2001 – Serguei Endrikhovski
2002 – Robin Jenkin
2003 – Ján Morovic
2004 – Efthimia Bilissi
2005 – Elizabeth Allen
2006 – James Sharpe
2007 – Christien J. Merrifield
2008 – Vien Cheung
2009 – Iris Sprow
2010 – Agnieszka Bialek
2011 – Toby P. Breckon
2012 – Anna Fricker
2013 – Yi-Ren Ng
2014 – Wen Luo
2015 – Not awarded
2016 – Gaurav Gupta
2017 – Lounis Chermak
2018 – Emma Talbot
2019 – Tobias Houlton
2020 – Dr Maria Castaneyra-Ruiz
2021 – Dr Carolyn Erolin
2022 – Edward Fry

Vic Odden Award
According to the Society's website this is an "award offered for a notable achievement in the art of photography by a British photographer aged 35 or under, endowed in memory of Vic Odden". Recipients of the Vic Odden Award:

1999 – Paul Lowe
2000 – Harriet Logan
2001 – Paul M. Smith
2002 – Donovan Wylie
2003 – Hannah Starkey
2004 – Adam Broomberg & Oliver Chanarin
2005 – Tom Craig
2006 – Stephen Gill
2007 – Simon Roberts
2008 – Alixandra Fazzina
2009 – James Mollison
2010 – Olivia Arthur
2011 – Venetia Dearden
2012 – Laura Pannack
2013 – Kate Peters
2014 – Jon Tonks
2015 – Matilda Temperley
2016 – Chloe Dewe Mathews
2017 – Jack Davison
2018 – Juno Calypso
2019 – Alix Marie
2020 – Daniel Castro Garcia
2021 – Sylvia Rossi
2022 – Carly Clarke

The Bill Wisden Fellowship of the Year
The Fellowship of the Year, inaugurated in 2012, was named after Bill Wisden for his 50-plus years service to the RSP's Distinctions. It is awarded for the most outstanding Fellowship of the year as decided by the Fellowship Board of The Society from more than 200 applications. Recipients have been:

Previous awards

Colin Ford Award
The RPS established the annual Colin Ford Award in 2003 for contributions to curatorship. It was named after the first director of the UK's National Museum of Photography, Film and Television (now the National Science and Media Museum), in Bradford, Colin Ford CBE.
 It has not been offered since 2015. Recipients were:

2003 – Paul Goodman, Brian Liddy, Dr Amanda Nevill HonFRPS, Russell Roberts
2004 – Professor Raymond P Clark ASIS HonFRPS, John R Page HonFRPS
2005 – Philippa Wright
2006 – Jane Fletcher
2007 – Gregory Hobson
2008 – Toni Booth
2009 – Pete James
2010 – John Falconer
2011 – Dr Dusan Stulik & Art Kaplan
2012 – Stephen Perloff
2013 – Dr Claude W Sui
2014 – Dr Sophie Gordon
2015 – Els Barents

Davies Medal
The Davies Medal was instituted in 1998 and was awarded until 2015 "for a significant contribution in the digital field of imaging science". Sponsored by Kodak European Research and Development, the medal was in memory of Dr E. R. Davies, who was a former Research Director of their Harrow Laboratories. Recipients were:

1998 – Kai Krause
1999 – Dr Michael Kriss
2000 – Stephen Watt-Smith
2001 – Professor David Whittaker
2002 – Dr Ghassan Alusi
2003 – Professor M. Ronnier Luo
2004 – Dr Peter Burns
2005 – Dr David Saunders
2006 – Professor Lindsay MacDonald
2007 – Professor Mark D. Fairchild
2008 – Professor Stephen Westland
2009 – Professor
2010 – Dr Mark Lythgoe
2011 – Dr Phil Green
2012 – Dr Sophie Triantaphillidou, ASIS, FRPS
2013 – Dr John D. Meyer
2014 – Peter Lawrence
2015 – Alessandro Rizzi
 No longer awarded

Saxby Medal / Saxby Award
An award, no longer awarded, which was given for achievement in the field of three-dimensional imaging, endowed by Graham Saxby Hon FRPS "in appreciation of the benefits of 50 years membership of The Society".

1998 – Professor S. A. Benton
1999 – David Burder
2000 – Professor Tung H. Jeong
2001 – Hans Bjelkhagen
2002 – Professor Nicholas Phillips
2003 – Jeff Blyth
2004 – Jonathan Ross
2005 – Robert Munday
2006 – Steve McGrew
2007 – Dayton Taylor
2008 – Not awarded
2009 – Professor Martin Richardson
2010 – Dr Trevor J. Maternaghan
2011 – David Huson
2012 – Dr Brian May CBE
2013 – Dr Carl Jones
2015 – Masuji Suto

Arms

See also
 List of European art awards
 British Institute of Professional Photography

References

Further reading 
There is no published history of the Society but the following provide historical background and partial histories. mainly of the early history of the Society.
 Jane Fletcher, "'Un Embarras de Richesses': Making the Most of the Royal Photographic Society Collection, 1970–1980", Photography & Culture, vol. 3, no. 2 (July 2010), pp. 133–152.
 John Hannavy (editor), Encyclopedia of Nineteenth-Century Photography, London: Routledge, 2008.
 Tom Hopkinson, Treasures of the Royal Photographic Society, 1839–1919, London: William Heinemann Ltd, 1980.
 J. Dudley Johnston, The Story of the RPS [1853–1869], London: The Royal Photographic Society, 1946.
 Marian Kamlish, ‘Claudet, Fenton and the Photographic Society’, History of Photography, 26 (4), Winter 2002, pp. 296–306.
 Michael Pritchard, '"The interchange of thought and experience among Photographers". 1853 and the founding of the Photographic Society", RPS Journal, 156 (1), February 2013, pp. 38–41.
 Grace Seiberling with Carolyn Bloore, Amateurs, Photography, and the mid-Victorian Imagination, London: Chicago University Press, 1986.
 Roger Taylor, All the Mighty World. The Photographs of Roger Fenton, 1852–1860. London:  Yale University Press, 2004.
 Roger Taylor, Impressed by Light. British Photographs from Paper Negatives, 1840–1860, London: Yale University Press, 2007.
 Roger Taylor, "Claudet, Fenton and the Photographic Society", History of Photography, 27 (4), Winter 2003, pp. 386–388
 Pamela Roberts, Photogenic: from the collection of the Royal Photographic Society, London: Scriptum Editions, 2000.

External links
 
 Members of the Royal Photographic Society, 1853–1901
 V&A Museum collection contains many images from the Royal Photographic Society's collections
 Library of Congress Selected for 1993–95 International Partnership Award – about 1994 joint exhibition with United States Library of Congress
 

Photography organizations established in the 19th century
Learned societies of the United Kingdom
Arts organizations established in 1853
1853 establishments in the United Kingdom
British photography organisations
Educational charities based in the United Kingdom
Organisations based in Bristol
Organisations based in the United Kingdom with royal patronage
Photography museums and galleries in England